Homostichanthidae is a family of sea anemones belonging to the order Actiniaria.

Genera:
 Homostichanthus

References

Actinioidea
Cnidarian families